Charles Léon Denuelle de la Plaigne, Count Léon (13 December 1806 – 14 April 1881) was an illegitimate son of Emperor Napoleon of France and Napoleon's mistress Louise Catherine Eléonore Denuelle de la Plaigne. Brought up in France, Léon began a military career in Saint-Denis where he was head of a battalion of the national guard.

Admirative of his father, he tried to keep the memory of the First Empire alive by organizing several commemorations. After the fall of his cousin Napoleon III and of the Second Empire, Léon retired in Pontoise, France, and died in poverty.

Biography 
Charles Léon Denuelle de la Plaigne was born on 13 December 1806 at No. 29, Rue de la Victoire, 9th arrondissement of Paris, Paris, France, to Napoleon and Napoleon's sister Caroline Murat's maid, Louise Catherine Eléonore Denuelle de la Plaigne. Napoleon chose his second name of Léon. He was Napoleon's first son, but was entrusted to a tutor and initially brought up in ignorance of his heritage. Napoleon had thought for a long time that he was sterile because his wife Joséphine de Beauharnais, who already had two children from a previous marriage, failed to get pregnant. Léon's birth was of "undeniable political importance" since it showed it was not Napoleon who was sterile. Napoleon considered adopting Léon, but realized his other illegitimate children would have claim to the crown and therefore abandoned the idea. Although he did not legitimize Léon, Napoleon acknowledged Léon as his son and gave him a pension of 3,000 pounds a year and rights to the profits on wood sold from Moselle.

Léon – short for Napoleon – was raised away from the imperial court, but always under his father's protection. The Emperor made him an heir in his will, and gave him the title of count. 

In 1832, Léon shot an orderly of the Duke of Wellington's, Charles Hesse, in a duel over losing 16,000 francs to Hesse in a card game. Writer Gareth Glover stated Léon was "completely unmanageable" in adulthood and became a "hardened gambler", having to go to debtor's prison twice. Biographer Andrew Roberts wrote he was an "argumentative drunken wastrel".

He married Françoise Fanny Jouet, with whom he had four children live past infancy (sons Charles, Gaston and Fernand; and daughter Charlotte). He died "poverty-stricken" on 14 April 1881. He is buried in a mass grave in Pontoise, Paris, France.

Léon’s daughter Charlotte Mesnard, who was interviewed in 1921 at the age of 55, said her father had a striking resemblance to Napoleon. She also said that two of Léon's sons and her own son were killed in the First World War. Comte Charles Léon, Léon's great-grandson, died in 1994.

Ancestry

Further reading
 La descendance naturelle de Napoleon I: Le comte Léon; Le comte Waleswki (translated in English): The natural descent of Napoleon 1st : Count Leon, Count Waleswki by Joseph Valynseele
Le Comte Léon, bâtard infernal de Napoléon (translated in English): Le Comte Léon, infernal bastard of Napoleon by Joseph Verbet
 Napoleon's Love Child: A Biography of Count Leon by Dennis Walton Dodds, ISBN 9780718303334

References 

1806 births
1881 deaths
Charles Leon
Illegitimate children of Napoleon
Sons of emperors
Sons of kings